Eustace of Boulogne  may refer to one of these four Counts of Boulogne:
Eustace I, Count of Boulogne r.1045-1049, son of Count Baldwin II of Boulogne and Adelina of Holland
Eustace II, Count of Boulogne (c. 1015-1020 – c. 1087), count of Boulogne from 1049–1087 and companion of William the Conqueror
Eustace III, Count of Boulogne, count of Boulogne, son of Eustace II of Boulogne and Ida of Lorraine
Eustace IV, Count of Boulogne (c. 1130–1153), Count of Boulogne and son and heir of Stephen of England